The 2015 Esiliiga was the 25th season of the Esiliiga, second-highest Estonian league for association football clubs, since its establishment in 1992. The season started on 8 March 2015 and concluded on 8 November 2015.

Flora II won the league on the last day of the season, finishing with 72 points. It was their second league title.

Tarvas finished 4th and were promoted to the Meistriliiga for the first time in their history. Tallinna Kalev finished 6th and qualified to the promotion play-offs but were beaten by Tammeka 2–4 on aggregate.

Santos finished 8th but avoided the relegation play-offs after Sillamäe Kalev II withdrew. Vaprus and Kuressaare were the bottom two teams and were relegated to the Esiliiga B.

Teams

Stadia

Personnel and kits

Managerial changes

Results

League table

Result tables

First half of the season

Second half of the season

Play-offs

Promotion play-offs
Tallinna Kalev, who finished 6th, faced Tammeka, the 9th-placed 2015 Meistriliiga side for a two-legged play-off. The winner on aggregate score after both matches earned entry into the 2016 Meistriliiga. Tammeka won 4–2 on aggregate.

First leg

Second leg

Relegation play-offs
Santos, who finished 8th, were supposed to face Sillamäe Kalev II, the 3rd-placed 2015 Esiliiga B side for a two-legged play-off. However, the play-offs were abandoned after Sillamäe Kalev II withdrew and Santos retained their Esiliiga spot for the 2016 season.

Season statistics

Top scorers

Awards

Monthly awards

Annual awards

Player of the Season
Eduard Golovljov was named Player of the Season.

See also
 2014–15 Estonian Cup
 2015–16 Estonian Cup
 2015 Meistriliiga
 2015 Esiliiga B

References

Esiliiga seasons
2
Estonia
Estonia